Mattiello is an Italian surname. Notable people with the surname include:

 Federico Mattiello (born 1995), Italian footballer
 Gino Mattiello, Italian weightlifter
 Nicholas Mattiello (born 1963), American politician

Italian-language surnames